Willie Clark may refer to:

Willie Clark (American football) (born 1972), American football player 
Willie Clark (baseball) (1872–1932), 19th century baseball player
Willie Clark (footballer, born 1918) (1918–2008), Scottish football (soccer) player (Hibernian, St. Johnstone)
Willie Clark (footballer, born 1932) (1932–2006), Scottish football (soccer) player (QPR)
Willie Clark (ice hockey) (born 1931), British ice hockey player
Willie Clarke (songwriter), co-founder of Miami's first Black-owned record label

See also
William Clark (disambiguation)
Willie Clarke (disambiguation)